Aisha (also spelled A'aisha, A'isha, Aischa, Aische, Aishah, Aishat, Aishath, Aicha, Aïcha, Aisya, Aisyah, Aiša, Ajša, Aixa, Ayesha, Aysha, Ayşe, Ayisha, or Iesha) is an Arabic female given name. It originated from Aisha, the third wife of the Islamic prophet, Muhammad, and is a very popular name among Muslim women.

Ayesha and Aisha are common variant spelling in the Arab World and among American Muslim women in the United States, where it was ranked 2,020 out of 4,275 for females of all ages in the 1990 US Census. The name Ayesha was briefly popular among English-speakers after it appeared in the book She by Rider Haggard, as well as the song "Aicha" by French Algerian singer Khaled.

Given name

Aisha
Aisha, a wife of Muhammad
Aisha (Latvian singer) (Aija Andrejeva, born 1986)
Aisha (reggae singer) (Pamela Ross, born 1962), a British singer
Aisha Abdurrahman Bewley Author or translator
Aisha Toussaint, Seychellois actress
Aisha Sultan Begum, first wife of the Mughal Emperor Babur
Princess Aisha bint Al Hussein, the sister of King Abdullah II of Jordan
A'isha bint Talhah, daughter of the prominent Muslim general Talha ibn Ubayd-Allah
Aisha Abd al-Rahman, Egyptian author
Aisha Hinds, American television and film actress
Aisha Kahlil, American female singer
Aisha Labib, former First Lady of Egypt
Aisha bint Khalfan bin Jameel, Omani government minister
Aisha Chaudhary, Indian motivational speaker
Aisha Syed Castro, Dominican Republic musician
Aisha Tyler, American television personality
Aisha Salaudeen, Nigerian multimedia journalist

Fictional characters 

Aisha (Gundam SEED), a character from Gundam SEED
Aisha Krishnam, a character from the anime Sky Girls
Aisha (Romancing SaGa), a character in the Romancing SaGa video game
Aisha (Rumble Roses), a character in the Rumble Roses video game series
Aisha (Winx Club), a character from the Winx Club franchise
Aisha Campbell, a character portrayed by Karan Ashley in the 1990s action television series Mighty Morphin Power Rangers
Aisha Clan-Clan, a character from the anime Outlaw Star
Aisha Kapoor, a character portrayed by Sonam Kapoor in the 2010 film Aisha
Aisha Greyrat, a character from the light novel Mushoku Tensei

Aishah
Aishah (singer) (Wan Aishah binti Wan Ariffin, born 1965), a Malaysian singer and politician
Aishah Azmi, British woman involved in Azmi v Kirklees Metropolitan BC
Aishah Sinclair, Malaysian actress
Wan Aishah Wan Ariffin, commonly known as 'Aishah', Malaysian singer and politician
Aishah and The Fan Club, a New Zealand-based band that Ariffin had fronted

Aicha
Princess Lalla Aicha of Morocco (1931–2011), Moroccan princess
Aicha Bassarewan, East Timorese politician
Aicha Mezmat, Algerian volleyball player
Aïchatou Mindaoudou, politician of Niger

Aixa
Aixa al-Horra, Sultanah consort of Granada

Ayesha
Ayesha Al-Taymuriyya (1840–1902), Egyptian author
Ayesha Harruna Attah (born 1983), Ghanaian writer
Ayesha Curry (born 1989), Canadian-American actress and television personality
Ayesha Dharker (born 1977), British actress
Ayesha Faridi, anchor for the Indian business news channel CNBC TV18
Ayesha Gaddafi (born 1976), daughter of Muammar Gaddafi
Ayesha Jalal, Pakistani-American sociologist and historian
Ayesha Jhulka (born 1972), former Indian film actress
Ayesha Kapur (born 1994), Indian film actress
Ayesha Khan (born 1982), Pakistani actress
Ayesha Omar, Pakistani actress/singer 
Ayesha Quraishi (born 1981), Botswana-born Swedish performer 
Ayesha Sana, Pakistani actress
Ayesha Siddiqa (born 1966), Pakistani security analyst and strategic affairs columnist
Ayesha Takia (born 1986), Indian actress who appears in Bollywood movies
Ayesha, a name used by the Marvel Comics character Kismet (Marvel Comics)
Bibi Ayesha, warlord in Afghanistan

Ayşe
Ayşe Arman (born 1969), Turkish journalist and author
Ayşe Begüm Onbaşı (born 2001), Turkish  aerobic gymnast 
Ayşe Cora (born 1993), Turkish basketball player
Ayşe Erzan (born 1949), Turkish theoretical physicist
Ayşe Hafsa Sultan (1479–1534), Ottoman sultan Selim I's wife and the mother of Süleyman the Magnificent
Ayşe Hatun (born 1510), the wife of Ottoman Sultan Bayezid II and the mother of Sultan Selim I
Ayşe Hatun Önal (born 1978), Turkish model, actress, singer and Miss Turkey 1999 
Ayşe Kulin (born 1941), Turkish novelist
Ayşe Kuru (born 1974), Turkish women's footballer
Ayşe Melis Gürkaynak (born 1990), Turkish volleyball player
Ayşe Önal (born 1955), Turkish journalist and writer
Ayşe Ören (born 1980), Turkish designer and sculptor
Ayşe Şahin, Turkish-American mathematician
Ayşe Sezgin (born 1958), Turkish diplomat and former ambassador
Ayşe Sine (1761–1828), the wife of Ottoman Sultan Abdul Hamid I and the mother of Mustafa IV
Ayşe Sinirlioğlu (born 1956), Turkish diplomat and ambassador
Ayşe Şan, Kurdish singer
Ayşe Şekibe İnsel (1886–1970), Turkish farmer and politician
Ayşe Tekdal (born 1999), Turkish race walker

Aishath
Aishath Inaya (born 1968), Maldivian singer
Aishath Rishmy (born 1985), Maldivian actress
Aishath Sausan (born 1988), Maldivian swimmer
Aishath Sajina (born 1997), Maldivian swimmer

Aische
Aische Pervers (born 1986), German pornographic actress

See also
Aisha (disambiguation)
Arabic name
Ayşegül
Turkish name

References

Arabic feminine given names
Pakistani feminine given names
Turkish feminine given names
Bosnian feminine given names